German submarine U-764 was a Type VIIC U-boat built for Nazi Germany's Kriegsmarine for service during World War II.
She was laid down on 1 February 1941 by Kriegsmarinewerft Wilhelmshaven as yard number 147, launched on 13 March 1943 and commissioned on 6 May 1943 under Oberleutnant zur See Hanskurt von Bremen.

Design
German Type VIIC submarines were preceded by the shorter Type VIIB submarines. U-764 had a displacement of  when at the surface and  while submerged. She had two shafts and two  propellers.

U-764 was fitted with five  torpedo tubes (four fitted at the bow and one at the stern), fourteen torpedoes, one  SK C/35 naval gun, 220 rounds, and two twin  C/30 anti-aircraft guns. The boat had a complement of between forty-four and sixty.

Service history
The boat's career began with training at 8th U-boat Flotilla on 6 May 1943, followed by active service on 1 November 1943 as part of the 9th Flotilla in Brest, France. On 1 October 1944, she transferred to 11th Flotilla in Bergen, Norway; as the situation worsened in France following the invasion. She remained with 11th Flotilla until her surrender at the end of the war.

Wolfpacks
U-764 took part in eight wolfpacks, namely:
 Eisenhart 3 (9 – 15 November 1943)
 Schill 3 (18 – 22 November 1943)
 Weddigen (22 – 29 November 1943)
 Hinein (26 January – 3 February 1944)
 Igel 1 (3 – 17 February 1944)
 Hai 1 (17 – 22 February 1944)
 Preussen (22 February – 13 March 1944)
 Dragoner (21 – 28 May 1944)

Fate
U-764 surrendered on 14 May 1945 at Loch Eriboll, Scotland. She was sunk as a target in position  as part of Operation Deadlight on 2 February 1946.

Summary of raiding history

See also
 Convoy SL 140/MKS 31

References

Notes

Citations

Bibliography

External links

German Type VIIC submarines
1943 ships
U-boats commissioned in 1943
U-boats sunk in 1946
Maritime incidents in 1946
Operation Deadlight
World War II shipwrecks in the Atlantic Ocean
World War II submarines of Germany
Ships built in Wilhelmshaven
Ships sunk as targets